Cottondale is a census-designated place in Tuscaloosa County, Alabama, United States, now encompassed in the eastern suburbs of Tuscaloosa. The ZIP Code is 35453. Alternative spellings include Cotton Dale, Kennedale, Kennidale and Konnidale.

Cottondale was the site of cotton mills where the Knights of Labor had some success in organizing drives in the late 1880s; and where "Mother" Jones worked in 1904 while studying conditions for working women and children in the South.

Little girls and boys, barefooted, walked up and down between the endless rows of spindles, reaching thin little hands into the machinery to repair snapped threads.... Tiny babies of six years old with faces of sixty did an eight-hour shift for ten cents a day.... The machines, built in the north, were built low for the hands of little children.

Cottondale was originally called Kennedale in honor of Joseph Kennedy, one of the owners of a local cotton mill. In 1876, the name was changed to Cottondale for the cotton mill.

Demographics
In 2016 Cottondale's population was 3,546 people with a median age of 35.7 and a median household income of US$50,063.

See also
Holt, Alabama — an adjacent unincorporated community in Tuscaloosa County
Alberta City, Tuscaloosa — an adjacent suburb of Tuscaloosa City

References 

Census-designated places in Tuscaloosa County, Alabama
Census-designated places in Alabama